Julian Maroun (born 4 April 1993) is an Australian actor, best known for his roles as Corporal Peter "Pepsi" Abboud in Fighting Season and Farid in Logie Award-winning miniseries Romper Stomper.

Early life 
Maroun's parents were born in Lebanon.

Career 
His first Australian television role was in Catching Milat in 2015, directed by Peter Andrikidis.

In 2015, Maroun starred in and co-produced his debut short film with best friend Joseph Chebatte, Three Hearts, which was nominated at the Dances with Films festival in Los Angeles, screening at the Chinese Theatre Hollywood.

He played supporting roles in Australian television shows Cleverman, Janet King  and Girt by Fear, before a major dual role as twin brothers Haris and Amir Rexhaj in Deep Water, with Yael Stone and Noah Taylor in 2016.

In 2017, Maroun was given leading roles in the Logie Award-winning miniseries Romper Stomper (with David Wenham, Lachy Hulme, Sophie Lowe) and the Foxtel/Goalpost series Fighting Season (with Jay Ryan, Ewen Leslie, Kate Mulvany), as well as a supporting role in international feature film Slam opposite Adam Bakri in 2018.

In 2018, Maroun and Chebatte produced their second short film, Entrenched, starring Maroun and Toby Wallace, about four Australian soldiers in Afghanistan who capture a young boy.

Maroun appears in the first episode of the first series of the 2019 ABC TV series, Diary of an Uber Driver.

Maroun appears in Season 2 of Aftertaste.

Filmography

Television and web series

Film

References

External links

Living people
Australian people of Lebanese descent
Australian male actors
Year of birth missing (living people)